Brendan Ray Dassey (born October 19, 1989) is an American convicted murderer from Manitowoc County, Wisconsin, who at 16 confessed to being a party to first-degree murder, mutilation of a corpse, and second-degree sexual assault. He was sentenced to life in prison with the earliest possibility of parole in 2048. His videotaped interrogation and confession, which he recanted at trial, substantially contributed to his conviction. Parts were shown in the Netflix documentary series Making a Murderer (2015). The series examined the 2005–2007 investigation, prosecution, and trials of Dassey and his uncle, Steven Avery, both of whom were convicted of murdering the photographer Teresa Halbach on October 31, 2005.

After his conviction, Dassey's case was taken by the Center on Wrongful Convictions of Youth. In August 2016, a federal magistrate judge ruled that Dassey's confession had been coerced and overturned his conviction and ordered him released, which was delayed during appeal. In June 2017, a divided panel of the United States Court of Appeals for the Seventh Circuit affirmed the magistrate judge's order overturning Dassey's conviction. In December 2017, the full en banc Seventh Circuit upheld Dassey's conviction by a vote of 4–3, with the majority finding that the police had properly obtained Dassey's confession.

Early life
Brendan Ray Dassey was born to Barbara and Peter Dassey in Manitowoc County, Wisconsin. He has three brothers (Bryan, Bobby, and Blaine) and a half-brother (Brad).

At the time of his indictment, Dassey was a 16-year-old sophomore at Mishicot High School. With an IQ in the borderline deficiency range, he was enrolled in special education classes. Dassey was described as a quiet, introverted young man with an interest in WWE (he was reportedly upset when he missed WrestleMania 22), animals, and video games. Before this case, he had no involvement with the criminal justice system.

Murder of Teresa Halbach 
Photographer Teresa Halbach, born March 22, 1980, in Kaukauna, Wisconsin, was reported missing by her parents on November 3, 2005. Halbach, who had not been seen since October 31, resided next door to her parents in Calumet County. Halbach was known to have visited the Avery Salvage Yard in Manitowoc County on October 31, 2005.

On November 10, 2005, following the discovery of her Toyota RAV4 vehicle partially concealed on the Avery property, Calumet County Sheriff Jerry Pagel conducted a search and found the charred remains of Halbach. Her cell phone, license plates and car key were also recovered. On November 15, after Steven Avery's blood was found in her vehicle, Avery was charged with the kidnapping and murder of Halbach, mutilation of a corpse, and illegal possession of a firearm.

During the investigation, Dassey, Avery's alibi, underwent a series of interrogations without counsel or parent present, although Dassey and his mother consented to the interrogations, in which investigators made false promises to Dassey using approved interrogation techniques. While being interrogated, Dassey confessed in detail to being a co-conspirator in the rape and murder of Halbach and the mutilation of her corpse. His confession was later described as "clearly involuntary in a constitutional sense" by a US magistrate judge whose opinion was overturned by an appellate court. The U.S. Supreme Court upheld the appellate court by refusing to hear the case.

He was arrested and charged on March 1, 2006, with being party to a first-degree homicide, sexual assault, and mutilation of a corpse. The special prosecutor Ken Kratz held a major press conference about the two cases, discussing the charges against Avery and Dassey, and reading verbatim elements of Dassey's confession. It was widely covered by TV and newspapers.

Dassey later recanted his confession in a letter to the trial judge. He said he got most of his ideas from a book.

Interrogation 
Dassey was interrogated on four occasions over a 48-hour period, including three times in a 24-hour time frame with no legal representative, parent, or other adult present. Initially interviewed on November 6 at the family cabin in Crivitz, Dassey was interrogated via the Reid technique, which was developed to permit and encourage law enforcement officers to use tactics that pressure suspects to confess. Dassey had been clinically evaluated as being highly suggestible, which makes a suspect more compliant and can ultimately lead to improper interrogation outcomes such as false confessions.

Dassey recanted his confession and informed his defense counsel. He later charged that his first defense counsel collaborated with the prosecution to get Dassey to plead guilty in order to testify against Avery. The defense counsel was replaced. The Netflix series Making a Murderer (2015), which chronicles the trials of Dassey and Avery, has generated global dialogue centered around wrongful convictions, coerced confessions, interrogation of minors, and criminal justice reform.

Trial 

Dassey's first appointed lawyer, Len Kachinsky, was removed by the court on August 26, 2006, due to his decision not to appear with Brendan during the May 13 interrogation. He was replaced by two public defenders.

The Dassey trial began on April 16, 2007, with a jury from Dane County, Wisconsin. The trial lasted nine days, with a verdict delivered on April 25, 2007.

The jury deliberated for four hours, finding Dassey guilty of first-degree intentional homicide, rape and mutilation of a corpse. Though only 17 years old at the time, Dassey was tried and sentenced as an adult, and his intellectual limitations were ruled irrelevant. He was sentenced to life in prison with eligibility for parole in 2048 and incarcerated at the Columbia Correctional Institution in Portage, Wisconsin.

Public response and appeals 
In January 2010, Dassey's attorneys entered a motion for retrial, which was denied in December by Judge Fox. Fox's ruling was affirmed by the Wisconsin Court of Appeals in January 2013, and the Wisconsin Supreme Court declined to review it.

The release of Making a Murderer in December 2015 generated a wide, international audience and was met with significant media attention. There were numerous discussions regarding the prosecution of criminal cases. Due to the unprecedented response to the Netflix docu-series, by July 2016, Making a Murderer 2 was in production, focusing on the post-conviction process for Dassey and his family. His conviction has been appealed through the state court system and a petition for habeas corpus was filed in federal court. Because of the nature of Dassey's interrogations, there have been calls for the exoneration of Dassey with petitions for his freedom and the implementation of the "Juvenile Interrogation Protection Law in Wisconsin", which would prohibit police from questioning minors without a lawyer present.

In December 2015, petitions were submitted for the investigation of the police officers who interrogated Dassey, and January 2016, on the federal government's We the People website. Rallies in support of the exoneration of Dassey were held in the United States, London, Manchester, Melbourne, Sydney, and Perth. Supporters have been communicating with him via letters and contributing to his prison commissary.

Dassey is now represented by Steven Drizin and Laura Nirider, both professors at Northwestern University's Center on Wrongful Convictions of Youth and experts in false confessions from juvenile suspects. In December 2015, Dassey's attorneys filed a writ of habeas corpus in federal district court for release or retrial, citing constitutional rights violations due to ineffective assistance of counsel and a coerced confession.

In August 2016, United States magistrate judge William E. Duffin ruled that Dassey's confession had been coerced, and was therefore involuntary and unconstitutional, and ordered him released. In November, the Wisconsin Justice Department appealed Duffin's decision to the United States Court of Appeals for the Seventh Circuit, which blocked Dassey's release pending a hearing.

In June 2017, a three-judge panel of the Seventh Circuit upheld the magistrate judge's decision to overturn Dassey's conviction. Judge Ilana Rovner, joined by Judge Ann Claire Williams, affirmed, over the dissent of Judge David Hamilton.  On July 5, the Wisconsin Department of Justice submitted a petition requesting a rehearing en banc—by the entire 7th Circuit panel. On August 4, 2017, the Seventh Circuit Court of Appeals granted the State of Wisconsin's request for an en banc hearing with oral arguments set for September 26 in Chicago before a full panel of sitting judges.

On December 8, 2017, the full en banc Seventh Circuit upheld Dassey's conviction by a vote of 4–3, with the majority finding that the police had properly obtained Dassey's confession. Circuit Judges Joel Flaum and Amy Coney Barrett (who joined the court after argument in the case had been heard) recused themselves from the case and did not participate in the consideration or decision. Judge Hamilton's majority opinion was joined by Judges Frank H. Easterbrook, Michael Stephen Kanne, and Diane S. Sykes. Then-Chief Judge Diane Wood and Judge Rovner both wrote dissents, joined by Judge Williams.

On February 20, 2018, Dassey's legal team, including former U.S. Solicitor General Seth P. Waxman, filed a petition for a writ of certiorari to the United States Supreme Court. The case was assigned case number 17-1172. Justices were scheduled to discuss the case in conference to determine if they would hear the case on June 14, 2018, but the case was removed from the schedule without an explanation or a rescheduling order on the morning of the conference. On June 25, 2018, certiorari was denied.

See also 
Innocence Project

References

External links 
Dassey v. Dittmann (ED Wis, No. 14-CV-1310, 12 August 2016). Grant of petition for a writ of habeas corpus. 
Bluhm Legal Clinic Center on Wrongful Convictions of Youth at Northwestern University Pritzker School of Law

1989 births
Living people
American people convicted of murder
Criminals from Wisconsin
People convicted of murder by Wisconsin
People from Manitowoc County, Wisconsin
Prisoners sentenced to life imprisonment by Wisconsin
People from Crivitz, Wisconsin
People from Two Rivers, Wisconsin
21st-century American criminals